Innocent Muchaneka (born 3 August 1991) is a Zimbabwean footballer who plays as a midfielder for CAPS United and the Zimbabwe national football team.

References

External links

1991 births
Living people
Hwange Colliery F.C. players
Chicken Inn F.C. players
CAPS United players
Zimbabwe Premier Soccer League players
Zimbabwean footballers
Zimbabwe international footballers
Association football midfielders